Saleh Hardani (born December 27, 1998, aka Saadat Hardani) is an Iranian footballer who plays as a right-back for the Persian Gulf Pro League club Esteghlal.

He is younger brother of Saber Hardani. 

Iran

Club career

Foolad 
He made his debut for Foolad in first fixtures of 2019–20 Iran Pro League against Sanat Naft Abadan.

Esteghlal 
He joined Esteghlal for 2019–20 Iran Pro League and scored an important goal against his previous club, Foolad, which made Esteghlal the champion.

Honours

Foolad

 Hazfi Cup: 2020–21

Esteghlal

 Persian Gulf Pro League: 2021–22
 Iranian Super Cup: 2022

References

External links 
 
 Saleh Hardani at Persianleague.com

Living people
1996 births
Association football midfielders
Iranian footballers
Foolad FC players